The Warren County School District (WCSD) is a public school district in Warren County, Pennsylvania, and it is designed to encompass all but three county municipalities. It has four attendance areas: North, East, West and Central. Warren County School District encompasses approximately 792 square miles. According to 2000 federal census data, it serves a resident population of 40,689. In 2009, the residents' per capita income was $17,898, while median family income was $42,714. In the Commonwealth, the median family income was 
$49,501 and the United States median family income was $49,445, in 2010.

Schools
Allegheny Valley Elementary School
Beaty-Warren Middle School
Eisenhower Middle/High School
Russell Elementary School
Sheffield Area Middle/High School
Sheffield Elementary School
South Street Early Learning Center
Sugar Grove Elementary School
Warren Area Elementary Center
Warren Area High School
Youngsville Elementary/Middle School
Youngsville High School
Warren County Career Center
Learning Enrichment Center

References

School districts in Warren County, Pennsylvania